Protease inhibitor can refer to:
 Protease inhibitor (pharmacology): a class of medication that inhibits viral protease
 Protease inhibitor (biology): molecules that inhibit proteases